was a freight train station on the Kagoshima Main Line of Japanese National Railways (JNR) located in Yahata Nishi-ku, Kitakyūshū, Japan. It served as a station between May 1, 1961, and February 1, 1984.

Its location was between Kurosaki Station and Orio Station, 1.9 km from the former and 3.3 km from the latter. In 2000, Jinnoharu Station opened partially utilizing the land of the former yard.

History 
 February 1, 1952 – JNR opens Orio Yard (sōshajō).
 May 1, 1961 – Higashi-Orio Station (freight only) opens replacing Orio Yard.
 October 1, 1974 – Higashi-Orio Station starts handling of baggage.
 May 1, 1979 – Higashi-Orio Station ceases handling of baggage.
 February 1, 1984 – Higashi-Orio Station closes and Higashi-Orio Yard (shingōjō) substitutes the station.
 April 1, 1987 – JR Kyūshū succeeds control of JNR in Kyūshū including Higashi-Orio Yard.

References 

Railway stations in Fukuoka Prefecture
Defunct railway stations in Japan
Railway stations in Japan opened in 1961
Railway stations closed in 1984